Elachista gleichenella is a moth of the family Elachistidae found in most of Europe.

Description
The wingspan is .The head is bronzy -metallic.Forewings are dark bronzy -fuscous ; a small basal spot, a fascia before middle, and an outwards -angulated fascia towards apex pale golden-metallic. Hindwings are grey.The Larva is whitish, faintly purple-tinged ; head dark brown ; 2 with two purple-blackish marks.

Biology
The larvae feed on Carex curvula, Carex digitata, Carex divulsa, star sedge (Carex echinata), glaucous sedge (Carex flacca), dwarf sedge (Carex humilis), smooth-stalked sedge (Carex laevigata), soft-leaved sedge (Carex montana), Carex morrowii, Carex muricata, Carex ornithopoda, false fox-sedge (Carex otrubae), greater tussock-sedge (Carex paniculata), pendulous sedge (Carex pendula), Carex pilosa, Carex sempervirens, wood sedge {Carex sylvatica}, Carex umbrosa, tufted hairgrass (Deschampsia cespitosa), white wood-rush (Luzula luzuloides),  hairy wood-rush (Luzula pilosa), Luzula plumose and greater wood-rush (Luzula sylvatica). Young larvae form a narrow meandering corridor, which gradually widens to nearly the full width of the leaf. The larvae make a new mine in early  winter most of the time. This mine is brown and situated close to (or within) the red coloured dying apical part of the leaf. Pupation takes place outside of the mine.

Distribution
The moth is found in most of Europe (except the Iberian Peninsula), east into northern Russia.

References

External links
Lepidoptera of Sweden
UKmoths

gleichenella
Leaf miners
Moths described in 1781
Moths of Europe
Taxa named by Johan Christian Fabricius